Hockey is a 1981 sports video game published by Gamma Software for the Atari 8-bit family. Gamma also released an Atari 8-bit soccer game the following year.

Gameplay
Hockey is a sports game in which 2-4 players compete in an arcade-style game.

Reception
Bill Willett, writing for his "Atari Arcade" column in the June 1982 issue of Computer Gaming World, called Hockey "a delight to play." Later that year, also in CGW, Allen Doum stated: 

The reviewers in the 1983 book The Creative Atari called the game, "almost fast, never furious, and generally fun". The primary complaint was the slow movement speed of the players.

In Electronic Games, Bill Kunkel wrote: 

He also disliked the minimal feedback when a goal is scored.

See also
Ice Hockey for the Atari 2600

References

External links
Review in Softline
Addison Wesley Book of Atari Software 1984
Review in Creative Computing
Review in Antic

1981 video games
Atari 8-bit family games
Atari 8-bit family-only games
Ice hockey video games
Video games developed in the United States